The Provincial Council of Overijssel is the provincial council for the Dutch province of Overijssel. It forms the legislative body of the province. Its 47 seats are distributed every four years in provincial elections.

Current composition
Since the 2019 provincial elections, the distribution of seats of the Provincial Council of Overijssel has been as follows:

See also
 Provincial politics in the Netherlands

References

External links
  

Politics of Overijssel
Overijssel